The Buildwas Formation (Bw, BUI), formerly called Wenlock Shale and Buildwas Beds, is a geologic formation in Shropshire, England. It preserves fossils dating back to the Silurian period. The formation is the defining formation of the Sheinwoodian age of the Wenlock epoch, the Middle Silurian.

Description 
The Buildwas Formation comprises olive-green and grey calcareous mudstones and nodular to lenticular calcareous mudstones and argillaceous limestones with shell fragments present throughout. The top of the Buildwas Formation shows a gradational increase in thickness of beds and a number of limestone beds, where it grades into the overlying Barr Limestone Formation.

The formation has provided fossils of Eodictyonella capewellii.

See also 
 List of fossiliferous stratigraphic units in England

References

Further reading 

 Bassett, M G, 1989. The Wenlock Series in the Wenlock area. 51-73 in "A global standard for the Silurian System". Holland, C H and Bassett, M G, (editors). National Museum of Wales, Gelogical series No.9, Cardiff.
 A. D. Wright. 1981. The External Surface of Dictyonella and of other Pitted Brachiopods. Palaeontology 24(3):443-481
 Basset, M G, 1974. Review of the stratigraphy of the Wenlock Series of the Welsh Borderlands and South Wales. Palaeontology, 17, 745-777. 
 Cocks, L R M, Holland, C H, Rickards, R B and Strachan, I, 1971. A correlation of Silurian rocks in the British Isles. Geological Society of London, Special Report No.1. 
 Butler, A J, 1937. On Silurian and Cambrian rocks encountered in a deep boring at Walsall, South Staffordshire, Geological Magazine, 74, 241-257.

Geologic formations of England
Silurian System of Europe
Silurian England
 
Mudstone formations
Limestone formations
Deep marine deposits
Silurian southern paleotropical deposits
Paleontology in England
Much Wenlock